During the 2000–01 English football season, Grimsby Town F.C. competed in the Football League First Division.

Season summary
The 2000–01 season saw a boardroom change with Doug Everitt taking over from Bill Carr. Everitt dismissed manager Alan Buckley just two games into the season, replacing him with Lennie Lawrence, who earlier in his managerial career had guided both Charlton Athletic and Middlesbrough into the top flight. The new manager chop and changed the playing squad around and brought in some expensive loan signings from abroad such as Zhang Enhua, Menno Willems, David Nielsen and Knut Anders Fostervold. Despite this, the club struggled to avoid relegation, only securing their place in Division One on the last day of the season with a win over promoted Fulham.

Transfers

Transfers In

Loans In

Transfers Out

Loans Out

Final league table

Results
Grimsby Town's score comes first

Legend

Football League First Division

FA Cup

League Cup

Squad

Left club during season

References

Grimsby Town F.C. seasons
Grimsby Town